Lipocosma isola is a moth in the family Crambidae.

It is native to the Islas Marías, in the Pacific off Nayarit in west-central Mexico.

References

Glaphyriinae
Endemic Lepidoptera of Mexico
Fauna of Islas Marías
Jalisco dry forests
Moths described in 1965